Air Hamburg Luftverkehrsgesellschaft mbH (also known as AIR HAMBURG) is an open-base charter airline headquartered in Hamburg, Germany. According to its own statement, it is the "largest provider of charter business aviation in Europe".

In 2001, two entrepreneurs (Floris Helmers and Alexander Lipsky) founded Flugschule Hamburg - a commercial aviation school. In 2005, under a newly established company name, Air Hamburg, and with their single and twin-engine aircraft, they began offering regular round-trip flights to nearby areas including Germany's northern islands, such as Heligoland, Juist, Norderney and Sylt. Due to the increasing number of private charter requests, the Air Hamburg Private Jets brand was founded in 2006.
In February 2022, Air Hamburg was acquired by Vista Global Holding, the parent company of VistaJet and XOJET. Alongside Air Hamburg, Air Hamburg Technik, based at Baden Airpark, and Executive Handling, based at the Hamburg Business Aviation Center (GAT), were also acquired. The Flugschule Hamburg and Café Himmelschreiber remain in the ownership of the two original founders Helmers and Lipsky.

Services
Air Hamburg consists of 3 business units:

Air Hamburg Private Jets 
Since April 2006, Air Hamburg has been a full-service aviation provider based in Hamburg. The large-scale group of companies employs over 700 people. Air Hamburg Private Jets is Air Hamburg’s main business unit and the largest European charter airline for business jets.

Executive Handling 
Executive Handling is located at the Hamburg Airport Business Aviation Center (GAT). The Ground Handling Managers take care of the handling and processing of ground operations of arriving and departing jets at the GAT.

Air Hamburg Technik 
Air Hamburg Technik was established in 2016 and is qualified to service the following aircraft types:

 Embraer Lineage 1000E
 Embraer Legacy600/650/650E
 Embraer Praetor 600
 Embraer Legacy 450/ 500
 Cessna Citation XLS+
 Embraer Phenom 300

The Air Hamburg Technik hangar is located at Baden-Airpark, Rheinmünster and was newly built in 2022. The Air Hamburg Technik team includes more than 40 international employees.

Air Hamburg Partners

Flugschule Hamburg 
Flugschule Hamburg, one of the largest flight schools in Germany, offers training in accordance with JAR-FCL guidelines. The flight school is an ATO (Complex Approved Training Organization) recognized by the Luftfahrt-Bundesamt (German Federal Aviation Authority) and trains private, commercial as well as airline pilots. All current licenses can be acquired there.

Café Himmelschreiber 
Café Himmelschreiber is located directly next to the Business Aviation Center (GAT) at Hamburg Airport. It is both a public café and an event location directly adjacent to Hamburg Airport's tarmac. It also serves as a partner for exclusive catering within Business Aviation.

Destinations 
Air Hamburg offers worldwide business and leisure charter flights.

Fleet 

As of November 2022, the Air Hamburg fleet consisted of the following aircraft:

 2× Embraer Lineage 1000E
 3× Dassault Falcon 7X
 21× Embraer Legacy 600/650/650E
 2× Embraer Praetor 600
 1× Embraer Legacy 500
 1× Embraer Legacy 450
 9× Cessna Citation XLS+/XLS Gen2
 5× Embraer Phenom 300/300E
 1× Cessna Citation CJ3

References

External links 

 Official website

Airlines established in 2005
Airlines of Germany
Companies based in Hamburg